The Arctic Lands is a physiographic region located in northern Canada. It is one of Canada's seven physiographic regions, which is divided into three divisions—the Innuitian Region, Arctic Coastal Plain, and Arctic Lowlands.

Physiographic region 

Each of the three divisions is distinguished by topography and geology. The other physiographic regions are the Canadian Shield, the Hudson Bay Lowlands, the Interior Plains, the Cordillera, the Great Lakes–St. Lawrence Lowlands, and the Appalachian Uplands.

Innuitian region
There are two mountain zones in the Innuitian Region. In between lies a vast terrain with plateaus, uplands and lowlands.

Arctic Coastal Plain
The Arctic Coastal Plain includes its three divisions, Island Coastal Plain, Mackenzie Delta, and the Yukon Coastal Plain, each distinguished by physiographic characteristics.

Arctic Lowlands
The Lancaster Plateau, Foxe Plain, Boothia Plain, Victoria Lowland, and Shaler Mountains comprise the Arctic Lowlands. This includes parts of Ellesmere Island, Devon Island, Somerset Island and the Brodeur Peninsula.

References

Landforms of Yukon
Physiographic regions of Canada
Geography of the Arctic
Landforms of the Northwest Territories
Landforms of Nunavut